The Rare Poultry Society, established in 1969, is a British breed club devoted to the protection and promotion of rare poultry breeds, which the Society defines as breeds that do not have their own breed club in the United Kingdom. The society's quarterly newsletter has been used as the source material for a number of books on rare breeds in the United Kingdom.

Notes

Works cited

See also
 Poultry Club of Great Britain
 Rare breed (agriculture)

Breeder organizations
Poultry farming in the United Kingdom
Poultry fancy organizations
Agricultural organisations based in the United Kingdom
1969 establishments in the United Kingdom